The Uspantek (Uspantecos, Uspantekos) are a Maya people in Guatemala, principally located in the municipality of Uspantán. The Uspantek language is a K’ichean-Mamean language, like Kʼicheʼ.

Notes

References
 
 

Indigenous peoples in Guatemala
Maya peoples
Mesoamerican cultures